Starobaishevo (İśke Bayış) is a rural locality (a selo) and the administrative centre of Starobaishevsky Selsoviet, Dyurtyulinsky District, Bashkortostan, Russia. The population was 631 as of 2010. There are 8 streets.

Geography 
Starobaishevo is located 21 km southeast of Dyurtyuli (the district's administrative centre) by road. Akaneyevo is the nearest rural locality.

References 

Rural localities in Dyurtyulinsky District